Willi Jäger (born 15 August 1940 in Kschellowitz, Bohemia) is a German mathematician.

He completed his PhD in 1966 the University of Munich under the direction of Erhard Heinz.

From 1969 to 1970 Jäger was a visiting scientist at the Courant Institute in New York City. In 1970 he became professor of mathematics at the University of Münster and from 1974 he became professor of applied mathematics at the Heidelberg University. In 1987 Jäger was founding member of the Interdisciplinary Center for Scientific Computing in Heidelberg. He is a board member of the Mathematical Research Institute of Oberwolfach.

In addition to problems of scientific computing, including the effective use of computers for the mathematical modeling of complicated, mostly scientific problems, Jäger deals with problems of nonlinear differential equations, calculus of variations, branching processes, and the spectral theory of differential operators, mostly with a view to specific applications such as data visualization.

Thus far, he has been honoured with 2 honorary doctorates, several prizes and the Order of Merit of the Federal Republic of Germany. He gave a DMV Gauss Lecture in 2007.

Jäger had more than 100 PhD students, including Florin Diacu, Bernold Fiedler, Stephan Luckhaus, and Martin Vingron.

References

External links

 

Officers Crosses of the Order of Merit of the Federal Republic of Germany
20th-century German mathematicians
21st-century German mathematicians
1940 births
Living people
People from Plzeň-North District
Ludwig Maximilian University of Munich alumni
Academic staff of the University of Münster
Academic staff of Heidelberg University
Fulbright alumni